Hypocalymma melaleucoides is a member of the family Myrtaceae endemic to Western Australia.

It blooms between September and November producing pink-blue flowers.

It is found in a small area along the south coast in swamps or breakaways in the Great Southern region of Western Australia centred around Ravensthorpe where it grows in sandy to loamy soils over quartzite.

References

melaleucoides
Endemic flora of Western Australia
Rosids of Western Australia
Endangered flora of Australia
Plants described in 2002
Taxa named by Gregory John Keighery
Taxa named by Arne Strid